Henricus cerussatus is a species of moth of the family Tortricidae. It is found in Morona-Santiago Province, Ecuador.

The wingspan is about 27.5 mm. The ground colour of the forewings is cream white with pale brownish-grey suffusions and lines. The hindwings are slightly paler than the forewings, with distinct grey strigulae (fine streaks) and fasciae.

Etymology
The species name refers to the whitish ground colour of the forewings and is derived from Latin cerussa (meaning white paint).

References

Moths described in 2006
Henricus (moth)